This is a list of aircraft in alphabetical order by manufacturer covering names beginning with 'J'.

J

J & J Ultralights
(Live Oak, FL)
J & J Ultralights Tukan
J & J Ultralights Seawing

Jabiru Aircraft 
Jabiru J120 
Jabiru J160
Jabiru J170
Jabiru J200
Jabiru J230
Jabiru J400
Jabiru J430
Jabiru J450
Jabiru LSA
Jabiru SK
Jabiru SP
Jabiru ST3
Jabiru UL-D
 Jabiru Calypso

Jacuzzi 
((Giocondos) Jacuzzi & Bros, 2043 San Pablo Ave, Berkeley, CA (established by seven brothers to build propellers under military contract).)
 Jacuzzi 1920 Single Seater Monoplane 1 
 Jacuzzi 1920 Single Seater Monoplane 2
 Jacuzzi J-7 Reo

Jackaroo Aircraft Limited 
Thruxton, England, United Kingdom
 Thruxton Jackaroo

Jackson 
(Clifford C Jackson, Birmingham and Marysville, MI)
 Jackson O-2

Jackson 
(Jackson Aircraft Corp (A J McCourtie), Reynolds Field, Jackson, MI)
 Jackson B-2

Jackson 
(Dr Lewis A Jackson, Central State Univ, Wilberforce, OH)
 Jackson Versatile I N9666H, tractor propeller, folding parasol wing
 Jackson N8072 1956, pusher propeller, low-wing monoplane with folding wings, experimental, roadable aircraft
 Jackson Concept-7 N569A, high-wing monoplane, pusher propeller 
 Jackson J-10 1981, Tractor propeller, low-wing monoplane incorporating wing fittings that allowed for quick removal of the wings for towing the airplane.

Jacobs 
(Multiplane Ltd (fdr: Henry William Jacobs), Atchison. KS)
 Jacobs 1910 Multi-plane

Jacobs 
(Jacobs Aircraft Engine Co, Pottstown. PA 1950: Helicopter Div formed.)
 Jacobs 104 Gyrodyne

Jacobs 
(Eastman N Jacobs, 148 LaSalle Ave, Hampton, VA)
 Jacobs 1929 Monoplane

Jacobsen 
(Arthur Jacobsen, Escanaba, MI)
 Jacobsen Tin Goose

Jacobsen 
(Joe Jacobsen, St Louis, MO)
 Jacobsen Imp

Jacquet-Pottier
(Robert Jacquet et Jean Pottier)
 Jacquet-Pottier JP-20-90 Impala

Jaffe 
(Jaffe Aircraft Corp, San Antonio, TX)
 Jaffe SA-32T Turbo-Trainer

Jameson 
(Richard J Jameson, Fullerton, CA)
 Jameson RJJ-1 Gipsy Hawk

Jamieson 
(William L Jamieson, Evansville, IN and Richmond, VA)
 Jamieson A
 Jamieson Speed Wing

Jamieson 
(Charles M Jamieson, Wichita, KS 19??: Jamieson Corp (pres: D M Lackey), DeLand, FL)
 Jamieson J-1 Jupiter
 Jamieson J (a.k.a. Take 1)

Jamme
 Jamme J.5

Janney 
(Janney Aircraft Co)
 Janney 1916 Aeroplane

Jannus Aeroplanes 
((Antony and Rodger) Jannus Aeroplanes, Battery Ave and Hamburg St, Baltimore, MD)
 Jannus 1914 Flying boat
 Jannus 1915 Flying boat

Janoir
(Ateliers d'Aviation L.Janoir)
 Janoir J-1
 Janoir J-2
 Janoir J-3

Janowski 
(Jarosław Janowski)
 Janowski J-1B Don Kichot
 Janowski J-2 Polonez
 Janowski J-3 Eagle
 Janowski J-5 Marco

Jancsó-Szegedy 
(Endre Jancsó & József Szegedy - built at MSrE)
 Jancsó-Szegedy M-24

Japan Aeroplane Manufacturing Works 
(Nippon Hikoki Seisakusho - Japan Aeroplane Manufacturing Works)
 Suzuki Gyro No.2 Tractor - (Shigeru Suzuki)
 Sakamoto No.6 - (Juichi Sakamoto)
 Umino Seaplane - (Ikunosuke Umino)

Japanese Special Attackers 
 Ta-Go

Jarvis 
(Jarvis Mfg Co, Glendale, CA)
 VJ-21 Jaybird (became Volmer VJ-21)

Jason (Homebuild Aircraft) 
 Jason XP-52

Javelin 
(Pasadena Aircraft Corp, Pasadena, CA)
 Javelin Californian

Javelin 
(Javelin Aircraft Co, Wichita, KS)
 Javelin Mullens Phoenix
 Javelin Wichawk
 Javelin T200A
 Javelin V6 STOL

Jayhawk 
(Jayhawk Aircraft Mfg Corp (founders: W D Egolf, D W Eaton), 915 E Lincoln, Wichita, KS)
 Jayhawk Mars 2

JBS 
((Jack B) Stinson School of Aviation, 229 E Baltimore Ave, Detroit, MI)
 JBS Aircoupe (2 seater)
 JBS Aircoupe (1 seater)

Jean 
(Jean Flying Machine Co.)
 Jean 1909 Helicopter

Jean-Montet 
(Phillipe, Pierre & Jean Montet)
 Jean-Montet Quasar 200

Jean St-Germain
(Centre du Recherches Jean St-Germain)
 Jean St-Germain Raz-mut ultra-light homebuilt

Jeannin 
 Jeannin Taube
 Jeannin Biplane

Jeanson-Colliex 
 Jeanson-Colliex 1913 Hydravion

Jeanvoine 
(Roland Jeanvoine)
 Jeanvoine RJ.01 Roitelet
 Jeanvoine RJ.02 Roitelet
 Jeanvoine RJ.03 Roitelet

Jeffair 
(Jeffair, Renton WA.)
 Jeffair Barracuda

Jennings 
(Jennings Machine Works, Uniontown, PA)
 Jennings RC Junior
 Jennings Sportplane

Jensen 
(Martin Jensen, San Diego CA. 1928: Jensen Aviation Corp, Lehighton, PA 1929: Jensen Aircraft & Marine Corp, Albany, NY 1930: Beckley College, Harrisburg, PA 1936: Jensen Aircraft Corp, James Island Airport, Charleston, SC c.1949: Jensen Helicopter Co Inc (founders: M Jensen & Chandler Hovey), Tonasket, WA)
 Jensen 3-L-W
 Jensen JT-1
 Jensen June Bug
 Jensen Model 21 (evolved into the Lift systems LS-3)
 Jensen Sport trainer

Jeof
(Jeof srl., Candiana, Italy)
Jeof Candiana

Jero
(Pierre de Caters and the Bollekens Brothers)
 Jero N° 9 Antwerpen 1911

Jet Pocket
(Chantelle, Allier, France)
Jet Pocket Top 80
Jet Pocket Top 210
Jet Pocket Top Must

JH
(JH Aircraft )
 JH Mini Corsair

Jiageng 
 Jiageng-1

Jidey 
 Jidey J.13 Flash

Jihlavan 
 Jihlavan KP-2U Skyleader
 Jihlavan KP-2U Skyleader 150
 Jihlavan KP-2U Skyleader 200
 Jihlavan Rapid 200FC
 Jihlavan KP-5 Skyleader 500
 Jihlavan Skyleader 600

JLB 
(John L Brown, Momence, IL)
 JLB 1922 Monoplane

Jingmen Aviation
(Jingmen, China)
Jingmen A2C Ultra Seaplane

Joby
(Joby Aviation)
 Joby S4

Jodel 
(Edouard Joly et Jean Délémontez)
 Jodel D.9
 Jodel D.10
 Jodel D.11
 Jodel D.11 Spécial
 Jodel D.18
 Jodel D.19
 Jodel D.20
 Jodel D.91
 Jodel D.92
 Jodel D.97
 Jodel D.111
 Jodel D.112
 Jodel D.113
 Jodel D.114
 Jodel D.115 - D11 with a 75 hp Mathis 4-GF-60 engine, amateur built.
 Jodel D.116 - D11 with a 60 hp Salmson 9ADR engine, amateur built.
 Jodel D.117 - D11 with a 90 hp Continental C90 engine and revised electrics, 223 built by SAN.
 Jodel D.118 - D11 with a 60 hp Walter Mikron II engine, amateur built.
 Jodel D.119
 Jodel D.120
 Jodel D.121 - D11 with a 75 hp Continental A75 engine, amateur built.
 Jodel D.122 - D11 with a 75 hp Praga engine, amateur built.
 Jodel D.123 - D11 with an 85 hp Salmson 5AP.01 engine, amateur built.
 Jodel D.124 - D11 with an 80 hp Salmson 5AQ.01 engine, amateur built.
 Jodel D.125 - D11 with a 90 hp Kaiser engine, amateur built.
 Jodel D.126 - D11 with an 85 hp Continental A85 engine, amateur built.
 Jodel D.127 - D112 with a sliding canopy and DR.100 undercarriage, EAC built.
 Jodel D.128 - D119 with a sliding canopy and DR.100 undercarriage, EAC built.
 Jodel D.140
 Jodel D.150
 Jodel D.185
 Jodel D.195

Johansen 
((Walter E) Johansen Aircraft Co, 4556 W 16 Place, Los Angeles, CA)
 Johansen JA-1
 Johansen JA-2
 Johansen JA-3

Johansen
 Johansen CAJO 59

Johns 
(American Multiplane Co, Bath, NY / Herbert Johns)
 Johns Multiplane

Johns 
(Alvis R "Ray" Johns, Orrstown and Chambersburg, PA)
 Johns 1934 Monoplane
 Johns Green Demon
 Johns KJ-1 Air Sport
 Johns Tornado J-V
 Johns X-3 Warrior
 Johns Ra-Son Warrior

Johnson 
((Clarence, Harry, Julius, Louis) Johnson Brothers Co, Terre Haute, IN 1908: Johnson Aircraft Building Shop.)
 Johnson 1908 Monoplane
 Johnson 1911 Monoplane

Johnson 
( (E A) Johnson Airplane & Supply Co, Dayton, OH c.1924: Driggs-Johnson Airplane & Supply Co.)
 Johnson Bumblebee (see Driggs-Johnson DJ-1)
 Johnson Canary
 Johnson Twin-60
 Johnson-Hartzell FC-1
 Johnson-Hartzell FC-2

Johnson 
(Clarence M Johnson, Detroit, MI)
 Johnson 1927 Monoplane

Johnson 
(Roy Johnson, Seattle, WA)
 Johnson 1928 Monoplane

Johnson 
(Jesse C Johnson, Milwaukee, WI)
 Johnson-Hamilton 1929 Helicoplane (modified Hamilton H-18)

Johnson 
(Richard B Johnson, 826 S Wabash Ave, Chicago, IL)
 Johnson Uni-Plane

Johnson 
(Bemus Johnson)
 Johnson 1935 moving aerofoil Aeroplane

Johnson 
(Buford E Johnson, Portland, OR)
 Johnson 1935 Monoplane

Johnson 
(Carroll L Johnson, Madison, WI)
 Johnson A

Johnson 
(Laird Aircraft Co & Harold Johnson, Dayton, OH)
 Johnson Special
 Johnson LC-DC

Johnson 
(A C Johnson, Long Beach, CA)
 Johnson 1941 monoplane

Johnson 
(Robert Johnson, Inglewood, CA)
 Johnson JR-1

Johnson 
((Rufus S "Pop") Johnson.)
 Johnson Bullet (9became the Regent Texas Bullet)
 Johnson Rocket 125
 Johnson Rocket 185 (became the Regent Rocket)

Johnson 
(Luther Johnson, Greenville, NC)
 Johnson 1948 Special
 Johnson 1949 Special

Johnston 
(Stanley Johnston, Wallacetown, Ontario)
 Johnston Missing Link
 Johnson 1962 Special

Johnston 
(Richard Johnston, Tucson, AZ)
 Johnston Jeaco 2

Johnstown 
(Johnstown Monoplane Co, Johnstown, PA)
 Johnston Jeaco 2

Jojo Wings
(Roudnice nad Labem, Czech Republic)
Jojo Addiction
Jojo Instinct
Jojo Quest Bi
Jojo Speedy
Jojo Yoki

Joly
 Motoplaneur Joly

Jona 
(Ing. Alberto Jona Studio Di Consulenza Aeronautica)
 Jona J-6
 Jona J-6S
 Jona J.10bis a.k.a. Magni-Jona J.10bis

Jonas 
(Gerald Jonas, San Francisco, CA)
 Jonas Hummingbird

Jones 
(Harry Martin Jones, Providence, RI and Quincy, MA)
 Jones 1914 Biplane
 Jones 1915 Biplane
 Jones 1916 Biplane

Jones 
(George W. Jones, 924 Camp St, Indianapolis, IN)
 Jones Suicide Buggy#1

Jones 
((Ben) Jones Aircraft Co Inc, Schenectady, NY)
 Jones New Standard D-25
 Jones S-125
 Jones S-150
 Jones monoplane

Jones 
(Howell "Nick" Jones, Augusta, GA)
 Jones Half Fast

Jones
(L.J.R. Jones, Australia)
 Jones 1930 monoplane

Jones 
(Stanley Jones, 621 Wildwood, Mount Zion, IL)
 Jones 10A

Joplin 
(Joplin Light Aircraft)
 Joplin Tundra
 Joplin 1/2 Tun

Jora 
(Jora Spol s.r.o.)
 Jora Jora

Jordan 
(Linwood F Jordan/20th Century Aerial Navigation Co, Portland, ME)
 Jordan 1914 Triplane Ornithopter

Jordanov
(Asen Jordanov)
 Jordanov-1

Joslin 
(F A Joslin, Beaufort, SC)
 Joslin Chiisai Tanyoki

Joubert 
(Jean Joubert)
 Joubert J-3

Jovanovich 
(Helicopter Engr Research Corp (pres: D K Jovanovich), Boulevard Airport, Philadelphia, PA (company principals were formerly with Piasecki Co). 1951: Acquired by McCulloch Motors Co. 1957: Jovair Corporation.)
 Jovanovich JOV-1
 Jovanovich JOV-3
 Jovair 4 Sedan
 Jovair J-2

Joy 
((Ervin & Lyle) Joy Aircraft Co, 6359 N Lombard St, Portland, OR)
 Joy J
 Joy JX

JPM
(Le Mesnil-Esnard, France)
 JPM 01 Médoc
 JPM 02 Anjou
 JPM 03 Loiret
 JPM 03-7 Calva
 JPM 04 Castor
 JPM 05 Trucanou
 JPM 05 Layon
 JPM 06
 JPM 07

Julian
(Wombat Gyrocopters, St Columb, Cornwall, United Kingdom)
 Julian Wombat

Junglas 
(Vincent J Junglas, Rensselaer, IN)
 Junglas 1935 Monoplane

Junkers 
(Junkers Flugzeug-Werke A.G.)
 Junkers A 20
 Junkers A 25
 Junkers A 32
 Junkers A 35
 Junkers A 48
 Junkers A 50 Junior
 Junkers F 13
 Junkers F 24
 Junkers G 23
 Junkers G 24
 Junkers G 31
 Junkers G 38
 Junkers H 21
 Junkers J 1 
 Junkers J 2
 Junkers J 4 (J.I Blechesel (Tin Donkey) service designation)
 Junkers J 5
 Junkers J 6 
 Junkers J 7
 Junkers J 8
 Junkers J 9
 Junkers J 10
 Junkers J 11
 Junkers J 12
 Junkers J 14
 Junkers J 15
 Junkers J 1000 1920s trans-Atlantic passenger design
 Junkers JG 1
 Junkers K 16
 Junkers K 30
 Junkers K 37
 Junkers K 39
 Junkers K 43
 Junkers K 45
 Junkers K 47
 Junkers K 51
 Junkers K 53
 Junkers K 85
 Junkers R 02
 Junkers R 42
 Junkers S 36
 Junkers T 19
 Junkers T 21
 Junkers T 22
 Junkers T 23
 Junkers T 26
 Junkers T 27
 Junkers T 29
 Junkers W 33
 Junkers W 34
 Junkers CL.I
 Junkers D.I
 Junkers J.I Blechesel (Tin Donkey)
 Junkers R.1
 Junkers PS-4
 Junkers JuG-1
 Junkers TB-2 not to be confused with Polikarpov TB-2.
 Junkers KXJ1
 Junkers LXJ1 (Ju86)
 Junkers LXJ1 (Ju160)
 Junkers Navy Experimental Type J Trainer
 Junkers C-79
 Junkers Ju 13
 Junkers Ju 20
 Junkers Ju 21
 Junkers Ju 46
 Junkers Ju 49
 Junkers Ju 52/1m
 Junkers Ju 52/3m Tante Ju
 Junkers Ju 60
 Junkers Ju 85
 Junkers Ju 86
 Junkers Ju 87 Stuka
 Junkers Ju 88
 Junkers Ju 89
 Junkers Ju 90
 Junkers Ju 160
 Junkers Ju 186
 Junkers Ju 187
 Junkers Ju 188 Rächer
 Junkers Ju 248
 Junkers Ju 252
 Junkers Ju 268
 Junkers Ju 287
 Junkers Ju 288
 Junkers Ju 290
 Junkers Ju 322 Mammut
 Junkers Ju 352 Herkules
 Junkers Ju 388 Störtebeker
 Junkers Ju 390
 Junkers Ju 488
 Junkers Ju 635

Junkers wartime projects

 Junkers EF 61
 Junkers EF 126 "Elli"
 Junkers EF 127 "Walli"
 Junkers EF 131
 Junkers EF 132
 Junkers EF 140
 Junkers EF 150

Junkers-Larsen 
(Junkers-(John M) Larsen Aircraft Corp, NY)
 Junkers-Larsen JL-6
 Junkers-Larsen JL-12

Junkers Profly
(Kulmbach, Bayern, Germany)
 Junkers Profly Junkers Trike
 Junkers Profly Ultima
 Junkers Profly Junka UL/

Junkers Profly France
(Haguenau, France)
Junkers Profly France Junka UL

Junqua 
(Roger and Jean-Claude Junqua)
 Junqua-Andreazza RJ.02 Volucelle
 Junqua RJ.03 Ibis

Jupiter 
(Kenneth Champion, Gobels, MI)
 Jupiter J-1
 Jupiter K-2

Jurca 
(Marcel Jurca)
 Jurca MJ-1
 Jurca MJ-2 Tempête
 Jurca MJ-3 Dart
 Jurca MJ-4 Shadow
 Jurca MJ-5 Sirocco
 Jurca MJ-6 Crivats
 Jurca MJ-7 Gnatsum 2/3 scale variant
 Jurca MJ-7S Solo Single-seat advanced trainer version of MJ-7
 Jurca MJ-8 1-Nine-0 3/4 scale version of Focke-Wulf Fw 190
 Jurca MJ-9 One-Oh-Nine 3/4 scale version of Messerschmitt Bf 109
 Jurca MJ-10 Spit 3/4 scale version of Supermarine Spitfire
 Jurca MJ-11 Sea Fury
 Jurca MJ-12 Pee-40
 Jurca MJ-14 Fourtouna
 Jurca MJ-15 Delta
 Jurca MJ-16 Vent
 Jurca MJ-20 Tempête
 Jurca MJ-22 Bi-Tempête
 Jurca MJ-23 Orage
 Jurca MJ-50 - metal version (never built)
 Jurca MJ-51 Spérocco ("Special Sirocco")
 Jurca MJ-52 Zéphyr (named for the Zephyr wind) - utility version with converted Volkswagen automotive engine or Continental A65
 Jurca MJ-53 Autan (named for the Autan wind) - version with side-by-side seating - 2 built
 Jurca MJ-54 Silas (not related to the MJ-5 in any way but by number. It is a small transport with side by side seating and a cargo door in the back able to load (very) small vehicles. Reg: F-WGBT)
 Jurca MJ-55 Biso (named for the Biso wind - 1 built)
 Jurca MJ-56 Sirocco S
 Jurca MJ-58
 Jurca MJ-66 Crivats
 Jurca MJ-70 Full-scale variant of MJ-7 (not completed)
 Jurca MJ-77 Gnatsum 3/4 scale variant of MJ-7
 Jurca MJ-80 1-Nine-0 full-scale version of MJ-8
 Jurca MJ-90 One-Oh-Nine full-scale version of MJ-9
 Jurca MJ-100 Spit full-scale version of MJ-10

Just 
 Just Escapade
 Just Highlander
 Just Superstol

References

Further reading

External links

 List Of Aircraft (J)